Shankarpasha Shahi Jame Masjid, is an ancient mosque in the Habiganj Sadar Upazila of Bangladesh. It was built during the 15th century. It is located in the village of Uchail Shankarpasha, Rajiura Union, Habiganj.

History
From engraved inscriptions, it can be found that the mosque was completed in 1513 by Sultan Alauddin Husain Shah, On the memory of Shah Majlis-e-Amin, one of the Saints who came to spread Islam in the region along with Saint Sahjalal (R). His mazar is located next to the mosque. As years passed, the area became entrapped in dense vegetation and forest land. Recently, this mosque has been discovered again.

Description 
It is a one-storey building. The building has the same length and width which is 21 ft and 6in. The width of the verandah is slightly above 3 ft wide. It has four domes. It has one large dome on the main building and three smaller domes on the verandah. There are 15 doors and windows, almost equal in size. The thickness of the walls are all roughly 5 ft apart from the western wall which is about 10 ft. It has six decorative pillars in the four corners of the main hall and two corners of the verandah. There is a large pond behind the mosque. The mosque has three doorways, with the middle one much larger than the others. There is a minaret separate from the mosque which is not extremely tall.

Gallery

References

Habiganj District
16th-century mosques
Historic sites in Bangladesh
Mosques in Bangladesh
Mosque buildings with domes
Bengal Sultanate mosques